Intensive Care   is a 1991 Dutch action horror film directed by Dorna van Rouveroy. It stars popular Flemish singer Koen Wauters in his second and final film role and Hollywood actor George Kennedy. While the movie was not a box office success it did develop a cult following over the decades due to it being hilariously bad and campy. It has been shown during the Belgian-Dutch Nacht van de Wansmaak film festival.

Plot

The famous surgeon Dr. Bruckner suffers a car accident, which leaves him horribly burned and puts him into a coma for seven years. When he awakes at New Years' Night he starts a murdering rampage. As the plot progresses he stalks a girl named Amy, her boyfriend Peter and Amy's brother Bobby and tries to enter their house, while the friends try to fence him off.

Cast
George Kennedy as Dr. Bruckner
Koen Wauters as Peter
Nada van Nie as Amy
Michiel Hess as Bobby
Dick van den Toorn as Ted
Jules Croiset as Dr. Horvath
Huub Scholten as Inspector Eddy
Nora Tilley as Rose
Arthur Boni as Steven
Dolf de Vries as Hank
Barbara Barendrecht as Shirley
Fred Florusse as John
Simone Dresens as Christine
Fred Van Kuyk as Inspector Fox
Luc Theeboom as Bert

Reception

The film failed to make a huge profit, despite having the hugely popular teen idol Koen Wauters in the starring role, and was demolished by the critics. De Volkskrant reviewed it as: "A movie where every aspect goes so disastrously wrong that it almost seems like a parody."  Yet it quickly gained a cult following due to its poor acting, unconvincing special effects, bad English pronunciation and a plot hole-ridden story. The car accident that puts the surgeon into a coma has many unexplained explosions. For reasons that are never explained the surgeon goes on a murdering spree and manages to survive numerous attacks that would horribly injure any normal person. To top it all off the actor who played him before the accident (George Kennedy) is now obviously replaced by a different actor, covered in bandages. In one of the most infamous scenes the girl's boyfriend lies on the floor, bleeding due to stab wounds, which causes her to remark: "Moet ik een pleister voor je halen? Jeetje mina!" (Translation: "Shall I get you a little band-aid? Golly gosh"). The picture is traditionally shown during each edition of the Dutch-Belgian B-movie festival Nacht van de Wansmaak and has frequently been called "the worst Dutch movie ever." Due to this reputation it has been honored in the "Hall of Shame" of the festival.

See also
 List of films considered the worst

References

External links 
 

Dutch action horror films
1991 films
1990s Dutch-language films
1991 horror films
1990s action horror films
1990s slasher films
Dutch slasher films
Films shot in the Netherlands
Films set in the United States